Coleophora zernyi is a moth of the family Coleophoridae. It is found in Spain, Corsica, Sardinia, Cyprus and Lebanon.

The wingspan is about 17 mm.

Etymology
It is named for the entomologist Dr. Hans Anton Zerny.

References

zernyi
Moths of Europe
Moths of the Middle East
Moths described in 1944